(Welsh for "Opinion") is a monthly Welsh language current affairs magazine. It was established in 1962 and over 500 issues have been published. Its current editors are now Vaughan Hughes and Menna Baines, who took over from Dyfrig Jones in 2008, and the magazine is now published by Gwasg Dinefwr.

Barn includes articles relating to politics, language, culture, art and sport from Wales, the UK and abroad from a Welsh perspective.  The magazine has a prominent place in the history of the Welsh language and the Welsh nationalist movement in the second half of the 20th century, particularly under the editorship of Alwyn D. Rees.

Editors
 Emlyn Evans
 Aneirin Talfan Davies
 Alwyn D. Rees
 Gwyn Erfyl
 Robert Rhys
 Menna Baines
 Simon Brooks
 Dyfrig Jones
 Vaughan Hughes and Menna Baines

External links
  

 List of Welsh language periodicals on gwales.com

Monthly magazines published in the United Kingdom
News magazines published in the United Kingdom
Political magazines published in the United Kingdom
Magazines established in 1962
Politics of Wales
Welsh-language magazines
Magazines published in Wales